Robert Dudley Jolly  (born 1 October 1930) is a New Zealand veterinary academic, currently an emeritus professor at Massey University, specialising in animal pathology. Much of his research has been into animal models of human disease, including Batten's Disease and mannosidosis.

Born in Hamilton in 1930, Jolly was educated at King's College, Auckland from 1945 to 1948. He studied veterinary science at the University of Sydney, graduating BVSc with second class honours in January 1955. He then spent five years in veterinary practice in Rotorua, before returning to Sydney for doctoral studies and completing his PhD in 1964. Jolly was appointed a senior lecturer at Massey University the following year, retiring in 1995 with the title of emeritus professor.

Jolly was elected a Fellow of the Royal Society of New Zealand in 1985, and in 1995 he won the society's Hector Medal. In the 2005 Queen's Birthday Honours he was appointed a Member of the New Zealand Order of Merit for services to veterinary science.

References

External links
 Institutional homepage

1930 births
Living people
People from Hamilton, New Zealand
People educated at King's College, Auckland
University of Sydney alumni
New Zealand veterinarians
Academic staff of the Massey University
Fellows of the Royal Society of New Zealand
Members of the New Zealand Order of Merit
20th-century New Zealand scientists
21st-century New Zealand scientists